Didar Sandhu was a noted Punjabi folk singer and songwriter from Punjab, India. He used to tie a turban on stage. He mostly sang duets with various noted Punjabi singers like Surinder Kaur and Amar Noorie.

Didar Sandhu fell ill due to alcohol consumption and was admitted to DMC hospital in Ludhiana in 1991 where he died on February 16.

Early life

Sandhu was born July 3, 1942, to father S. Sardar Samund Singh and mother Daan Kaur, in the village of Chakk no. 133 in Sillanwali tehsil of Sargodha District in British Punjab. He was the youngest of five brothers. In 1947, due to partition the family moved to the Bodalwala village of Jagraon tehsil in East Punjab and later in 1956, settled in the Bharowal Khurd village of Ludhiana district.

In 1966, Didar married to Amarjeet Kaur of village Ghalib Kalan and couple had two children. Didar's son Jagmohan Sandhu is also a singer.

He also served as the Sarpanch of his village Bharowal Khurd, near Mullanpur Dakha in Ludhiana district, for fifteen years.

Career

As songwriter
Sandhu was very fond of poetry from his early age and started writing poetry in his school days. Didar's first song jatt barha bedardi was sung by Narinder Biba. In 1962, he was employed by Punjab Govt. where he met Mohd. Sadiq (a Punjabi singer) at a theatre company which did Punjabi dramas in early 1960s and both became very good friends. Most of his early songs were recorded in the voice of Narinder Biba and Mohd. Sadiq. He was noted for his song "meri aisi jhanjar chhanke, chhankata painda gali gali"''', sung by Mohd. Sadiq, gave him a very distinct identity in Punjabi music. His first song recorde as singer was pind dean mundean nu sanu vekh neend na aave with female singer Saneh Lata.

Sandhu has penned many songs for many noted Punjabi singers like Mohammad Sadiq & Ranjit Kaur, Narinder Biba & Beer Chand, Surinder Kaur & Ramesh Rangila, Surinder Kaur & Sabur Hussain, Sudesh Kapoor & Surinder Kaur, Promila Pammi & Ramesh Rangila, Karnail Gill & Swaran Lata, Karnail Gill & Preeti Bala etc.

 Singing 

He was noted duet singer of his era. During his career, Didar sung with many noted Punjabi female singers of his time and recorded many duets with singers including Saneh Lata (who, later, married overseas and left her singing career), Kuldeep Kaur, Parminder Sandhu, Baljit Balli in the 1980s. In 1980–82, he recorded about 20 songs with "Punjab Di Koel" (Nightingale of Punjab) Surinder Kaur. A film heroine, Rama Vij, also performed on stages with him. In 1981, Amar Noori started singing with him at a very early age and did it for a long time. An akhara'' of Sandhu and Noorie was also filmed for a Punjabi film, Gabhroo Punjab Da (1986).

Noted songs

phatak Kotkapure da
na maar zaalma ve, peke tattri de door
mera joban peeta
meri mahi-mahi kehndi di zuban sukk gayi
na kar mainu pyar (jad main doli charhgi)
jorhi jadon chubare charhdi
jal te phull tarda (boliyan)

See also

Tumbi – a music instrument
Kuldeep Manak
Amar Singh Chamkila
Lal Chand Yamla Jatt
List of Punjabi singers

References 

Punjabi-language singers
20th-century Indian male singers
20th-century Indian singers
1942 births
1991 deaths
Punjabi-language lyricists